A by-election was held for the New South Wales Legislative Assembly electorate of Granville on 23 June 1990 because of the resignation of Laurie Ferguson to successfully contest the 1990 federal election for Reid.

The Granville by-election was held the same day as the Heffron and Smithfield by-elections.

Dates

Results

Laurie Ferguson resigned.

See also
Electoral results for the district of Granville
List of New South Wales state by-elections

Notes

References

1990 elections in Australia
New South Wales state by-elections
1990s in New South Wales